The 3rd Central American and Caribbean Junior Championships was held in Xalapa, Mexico, on 25–28 August 1978.  This was already the second time that the city was hosting this event after the 2nd junior CAC games in 1976.  Moreover, both the inaugural 1st CAC senior championships in 1967 and the VI CAC senior championships in 1977 took place in Xalapa, Veracruz.  Both junior (under-20) and youth (under-17) competitions were held.

Event summary
The medal count is headed by Cuba, both in gold medals (25) and total number of medals (60).

In the under-20 men category, Anthony Bullard from the Bahamas gained 2 gold (400m, 4 × 100 m relay) and a silver medal (4 × 400 m relay), whereas Eric Berrie from Barbados got 2 gold medals.

In the under-20 women category, Norma Murray from Jamaica won 3 golds (200m, 400m, 4 × 100 m relay) plus one silver medal (4 × 400 m relay).  Doreen Small, Jamaican compatriot, won 2 gold medals (100m, 4 × 100 m relay).

In the under-17 men category, David Charlton from the Bahamas won 3 gold medals (400m, high jump, 4 × 400 m relay) and 1 silver medal (4 × 100 m relay).  Moreover, both Wayne Morrison and Dennis Wallace from Jamaica won 2 golds (100m, 4 × 100 m relay) and (200m, 4 × 100 m relay), respectively, and 2 silver medals (200m, 4 × 400 m relay) and (400m, 4 × 400 m relay), respectively.  The Cubans Lázaro González and Juan Pineira won 2 gold (shot put, discus throw) and 1 silver medal (hammer throw),  and 2 gold (100m hurdles, 300m hurdles) and 1 bronze (4 × 100 m relay), respectively.

Top athletes in the under-17 women category was Mary Ann Higgs from the Bahamas winning 4 golds (100m, 200m, 4 × 100 m relay, 4 × 400 m relay) and 1 silver (400m), as well as Bahamian compatriot Monique Millar winning 2 golds (4 × 100 m relay, 4 × 400 m relay) and 3 bronze medals (100m, 200m, 400m).

In addition, the championships saw early appearances of multi-medalist Merlene Ottey from Jamaica gaining 1 gold (4 × 100 m relay), 1 silver (4 × 400 m relay), and 1 bronze medal (200m) at this event in the under-20 category, before winning, for example,  3 gold, 4 silver and 7 bronze medals at various IAAF World Championships in Athletics between 1983 and 1997, and 3 silver and 6 bronze medals at various Olympic Games between 1980 and 2000.  Grace Jackson from Jamaica, 200m silver medalist at the 1988 Olympic Games in Seoul, Korea, won the under-20 high jump competition, whereas Cuban athlete Silvia Costa, high jump silver medalist at the 1993 World Championships in Athletics in Stuttgart, Germany, won gold in high jump and silver in 100m hurdles in the under-17 category.

Medal summary
Medal winners are published by category: Junior A, Male, Junior A, Female, and combined Junior B.  Complete results can be found on the World Junior Athletics History website.

Male Junior A (under 20)

Female Junior A (under 20)

Male Junior B (under 17)

Female Junior B (under 17)

Medal table (unofficial)

Participation (unofficial)

Detailed result lists can be found on the World Junior Athletics History website.  They comprise about 293 athletes (157 junior (under-20) and 136 youth (under-17)) from about 10 countries:

 (22)
 (8)
 (19)
 (57)
 (17)
 (28)
 (90)
 (8)
 (16)
 (28)

References

External links
Official CACAC Website
World Junior Athletics History

Central American and Caribbean Junior Championships in Athletics
International athletics competitions hosted by Mexico
Central American and Caribbean Junior Championships
Central American and Caribbean Junior Championships
Central American and Caribbean Junior Championships